Brain fingerprinting is a scientific technique which uses brain waves from a electroencephalography (EEG) to determine whether specific information is stored in the subjects cognitive memory. Brain Fingerprinting does not detect or measure lies, stress, and emotion. It is detected through brainwaves that measure the neurological behavior of the human brain. Brain fingerprinting is determined through information present or information absent. It has statistically proven to have no false positives and no false negatives  The technique involves presenting words, phrases, or pictures containing salient details about a crime or investigated situation on a computer screen, in a series with other, irrelevant stimuli. Brain Fingerprinting has been scientifically proven to work and has been used in legitimate investigations. The test results themselves can not be admitted as evidence. In spite of that, information or material that was discovered during the test can be used as evidence in a legal trial.

Brain fingerprinting came about in 1999, when a man named  James Grinder confessed to committing a murder that happened 15 years prior. In a short time after his confession, he retracted his statements. The police were struggling to incriminate Grinder because of the evidence being old. The police reached out to Dr. Lawrence Farwell, the man who discovered Brain Fingerprinting. Soon after taking the test Grinder confessed to the murder of Julie Helton and three other murders as well.

See also 
 Handwriting analysis
 Lie detection

References 

Lie detection
Psychology controversies